Euphoberia is an extinct genus of millipede from the Pennsylvanian epoch of the Late Carboniferous, measuring up to  in length, that is small in Euphoberiidae which contains species with length about .  Fossils have been found in Europe  and North America.

There has been uncertainty about the appropriate classification of Euphoberia since its description in 1868: it has been referred to as a centipede, millipede, or a separate, independent group within the myriapods. It is currently placed in the Archipolypoda, an extinct group of millipedes. Several species described in the late 19th century have since been assigned to the related genera Myriacantherpestes and Acantherpestes.

References 

Carboniferous myriapods
Carboniferous arthropods of North America
Carboniferous arthropods of Europe
Fossil taxa described in 1868